Chris-Craft Boats was an American manufacturer of boats that was founded by Christopher Columbus Smith (1861–1939). The company was sold by the Smith family in 1960 to NAFI Corporation, which changed its name to Chris-Craft Industries in 1962. The current successor is Chris-Craft Corporation, which produces motorboats under the Chris-Craft name.

History

Chris Smith built his first wooden boat in 1874 at the age of 13. Years later, he built a duck hunting boat. His friends liked the way he built them, and they asked him to build them one. This was technically the start of the boat company. He soon began to build more boats and joined his brother Hank in 1881 to begin producing boats full-time. 

In 1910, the brothers joined with other partners to form the Smith Ryan Boat Company. The firm's name was changed in 1922 to Chris Smith & Sons Boat Company, then to Chris-Craft in 1924. The Detroit-area company became well known for its sleek racing boats in the 1910s and 1920s. Chris-Craft sold high-end powerboats to wealthy patrons such as Henry Ford and William Randolph Hearst. 

In the late 1920s, Chris-Craft extended its market into the middle class when it became one of the first mass-producers of civilian pleasure boats. The company began assembly line production at their plant in Algonac, Michigan, on the St. Clair River, dramatically lowering production costs. Formerly, most powerboats had been hand-built. Engines were supplied by both Ford and Chrysler, and by the Hercules Engine Company in later models.

In 1927, the company introduced the Cadet, an affordable 22' runabout. At the time, the domain of speedboats was largely confined to the wealthy. Its innovative advertising campaign promised a piece of "the good life" to the growing American middle class. The company sold its boats on the installment plan, making them among the first powerboats available to the general population.

The Great Depression robbed many Americans of discretionary income, and Chris-Craft sales suffered. The company introduced a line of low-priced powerboats to stay solvent. By 1935, a 15.5' utility boat sold for as little as US$406  ($ in  dollars ). During World War II, the company produced small patrol boats and launches for the U.S. Navy.

After the war, Chris-Craft introduced a new lineup of civilian pleasure boats in time for the massive American consumer expansion of the 1950s. That decade marked the height of company prestige, and the Chris-Craft brand name became virtually synonymous with pleasure boating. The company offered 159 different models, and it was the sales leader in many categories of small civilian powerboats.

The company sold high-end boats to famous customers such as Dean Martin, Katharine Hepburn, Frank Sinatra, and Elvis Presley. Their boats were often made from the finest mahogany and were considered to be among the best available. They were easy to operate, a must for their "weekend sailor" owners. In some circles, owning a Chris-Craft was expected. Even their lower-priced boats were considered to be of high quality, often featuring such luxurious items as a liberal use of mahogany, teak, and brass.

Chris-Craft manufactured its first fiberglass boat by 1955. The company added a metal boat division in 1957, designated as the Roamer Steel Boats Division (RSBD). This was founded upon its purchase of the Roamer Boat Company, and the boats became known as Chris Craft Roamers. 

The company was acquired by Shields & Company's NAFI Corporation in 1960 under which the company operated independently.  Chris-Craft Industries sold its boat division to Murray Industries in 1981, while retaining the Chris-Craft trademark and licensed it to Murray. Outboard Marine Corporation acquired the boat company in 1989, then went into bankruptcy in 2000 and was purchased by Genmar Holdings. Genmar sold the Chris-Craft boat division to Stellican Ltd., then Stellican purchased the Chris-Craft trademark from News Corporation, thus reuniting the two parts of the boat company.

In June 2018, Winnebago Industries Inc. acquired Chris Craft.

References

External links

American boat builders
Manufacturing companies established in 1910
1910 establishments in Michigan
1960 mergers and acquisitions
Manufacturing companies disestablished in 1962
1962 disestablishments in Michigan
American companies established in 1910
American companies disestablished in 1962
Defunct manufacturing companies based in Michigan